Sebastian Peschko (30 October 1909 – 29 September 1987) was a German classical pianist, specialized in the art form of lieder. He was accompanist to some of the foremost lyrical singers of the 20th century.

Life and career
Peschko was born in Berlin on the October 30th, 1909. His father was Paul Peschko, an organist and private lecturer. From 1927 to 1933, he studied at the Hochschule für Musik (today: Berlin University of the Arts), supported by a Bechstein scholarship from 1930 onwards. During that period he was a student of Edwin Fischer. In 1933, Peschko won the Mendelssohn-Award. Following this, he played alongside Germany's foremost lyric baritone singer, Heinrich Schlusnus, touring globally from 1934 until 1950.

Peschko was remembered as the piano partner of a number of notable singers, including Theo Altmeyer, Erna Berger, Walter Berry, Rudolf Bockelmann, Grace Bumbry, Franz Crass, Lisa Della Casa, Karl Erb, Nicolai Gedda, Agnes Giebel, Ernst Haefliger, Ilse Hollweg, Werner Hollweg, Heinz Hoppe, Christa Ludwig, Maria Müller, Hermann Prey, Ruth-Margret Pütz, Walther Pützstück, Erna Sack, Hanna Schwarz, Franz Völker, Bernd Weikl and Marcel Wittrisch.

Peschko also played chamber music. His most well-known examples of this were projects with violinist Georg Kulenkampff and cellists Enrico Mainardi and Hans Adomeit.

From 1953 to 1958, Peschko was responsible for lieder, choir, and church music at Radio Bremen. In 1958, Rolf Liebermann created a new department, lieder, at the Norddeutscher Rundfunk especially for Peschko. He went on to work there for multiple decades. On top of working as a producer, creative artist, and journalist, he also invented the format 'Meister des Liedes''' (Masters of lieder).

Peschko performed as tutor for lieder interpretations at the Mozarteum in Salzburg in the early 1970s.

Peschko composed the musical arrangements for four poems by Christian Morgenstern, which were performed by singer Helen Donath and pianist Klaus Donath globally.

In 1974, Peschko received the Federal Cross of Merit for his special artistic achievements.

The baritone Thomas Quasthoff was recognized and supported by Peschko early in his career.

Peschko died at the age of 77 in Celle, Germany, on September 29th, 1987. He had three daughters (Franziska, Johanna, Julia) and two sons (Peter, Pedro), the latter of whom was adopted. 

Dancer and choreographer Susanne Linke is the niece of Sebastian Peschko.

 Partial discography 
 1975: Heinrich Schlusnus sings lieder by Franz Schubert accompanied by Peschko (TELDEC)
 1977: Heinrich Schlusnus sings lieder by Robert Schumann accompanied by Peschko (Deutsche Grammophon)
 1994: Lisa Della Casa sings lieder by Richard Strauss accompanied by Peschko (Sbt)
 1999: Heinrich Schlusnus sings lieder accompanied by Peschko (Preiser)
 2002: Erna Berger sings lieder accompanied by Peschko (Orfeo d'Or)
 2002: Lisa Della Casa, Lieder and Arias'', accompanied by Peschko (EMI/Electrola)
 2004: Grace Bumbry – early recordings, accompanied by Peschko (Deutsche Grammophon)

References

External links 

 
 
 , Robert Schumann; Heinrich Schlusnus, Peschko
 , Franz Schubert; Heinrich Schlusnus, Peschko

1909 births
1987 deaths
German classical pianists
Male classical pianists
Musicians from Berlin
Classical accompanists
Recipients of the Cross of the Order of Merit of the Federal Republic of Germany
20th-century classical pianists
20th-century German musicians
20th-century German male musicians